Eckart Viehweg (born 30 December 1948 in Zwickau, died 29 January 2010) was a German mathematician. He was a professor of algebraic geometry at the University of Duisburg-Essen.

In 2003 he won the Gottfried Wilhelm Leibniz Prize with his wife, Hélène Esnault.

See also
Kawamata–Viehweg vanishing theorem

References

External links 
 Homepage
 Book: Hélène Esnault, Eckart Viehweg: "Lectures on Vanishing Theorems" (PDF, 1.3 MB)
 Book: Eckart Viehweg: "Quasi-projective Moduli for Polarized Manifolds" (PDF, 1.5 MB)

1948 births
2010 deaths
People from Zwickau
Gottfried Wilhelm Leibniz Prize winners
20th-century German mathematicians
21st-century German mathematicians
Academic staff of the University of Duisburg-Essen